Mighty Times: The Legacy of Rosa Parks is a 2002 American short documentary film directed by Robert Houston and produced by Robert Hudson. It was nominated for an Academy Award for Best Documentary Short.

Cast
 Coretta Scott King as herself (archive footage)
 Martin Luther King Jr. as himself (archive footage)
 Nick LaTour as Narrator
 E. D. Nixon as himself (archive footage)
 Rosa Parks as herself (archive footage)

See also
 List of documentary films
The Rosa Parks Story
 Civil rights movement in popular culture

References

External links

2002 films
2002 short documentary films
American black-and-white films
American short documentary films
American independent films
Cultural depictions of Rosa Parks
Documentary films about African Americans
Films directed by Robert Houston
Films about activists
2002 independent films
2000s English-language films
2000s American films